Mohd Afendy Tan Abdullah (born 1964) is a former Malaysian international lawn bowler.

Bowls career
He has represented Malaysia at two Commonwealth Games; in the fours event at the 1998 Commonwealth Games and in the singles event at the 2006 Commonwealth Games.

He won two medals at the Asia Pacific Bowls Championships.

He made his international debut in 1998 and is a state coach by trade.

References

Malaysian male bowls players
1964 births
Living people
Bowls players at the 1998 Commonwealth Games
Bowls players at the 2006 Commonwealth Games